Inebu-hedj (White Walls, also Inbu-Hedj, White fortress) was one of 42 nomes (administrative division) in Ancient Egypt.

Geography
Northern Ancient Egypt was known as mḥw, which means "north". Inebu-hedj was one of the 20 nomes in Lower Egypt and it was designated as district number 1, the primary district.

The Niwt (main city) was Menefer or Memphis (part of modern Mit Rahina). Saqqara was among the other cities of the region.

History
Every nome was ruled by a nomarch (provincial governor) who answered directly to the king.

Every niwt had a Hut netjer (temple) dedicated to the chief deity as well as a Heqa hut (nomarch's residence).

The main deity of the district was Horus. Apis, Hathor, Isis, Nefertem, Ptah, Seker, and Sekhmet were among others worshiped as major deities in the nome.

 the area is part of the Cairo Governorate.

References

 Helck, Wolfgang ; Westendorf, Wolfhart: Lexikon der Ägyptologie. Wiesbaden: Harrassowitz 1977.

External links

 About the nomes of Egypt
 Detailed map of the nomes
 Hieroglyfs of the nomes

Nomes of ancient Egypt